The Georgian Super Cup is a competition consisting of a single football match played between the champions of the Erovnuli Liga and the winners of the Georgian Cup. It was first held in 1996.

When a club has won both competitions, the Georgian Cup losing finalists play for the Super Cup. This occurred in 1996, 1997, 2013 and 2014 when Dinamo Tbilisi won the Double on all four occasions.

Since 2023 format of Super Cup changed - four teams, three teams, qualified for  Chamipons League and Europa Conference League from Erovnuli Liga and the winners of the Georgian Cup will play semi-finals, and final games. Losers of semi-finals will play third place play-off.

Supercup Finals (1996–2022)

Supercup (2023–)

2023

Performance by club 

Clubs in italics are defunct.

References

External links
Georgia - List of Super Cup Finals, RSSSF.com

 
Football competitions in Georgia (country)
National association football supercups
Recurring sporting events established in 1996
1996 establishments in Georgia (country)